The Carl Sagan Memorial Award is an award presented jointly by the American Astronautical Society and The Planetary Society to an individual or group "who has demonstrated leadership in research or policies advancing exploration of the Cosmos." The annual award, first presented in 1997, was created in honor of American astronomer, astrobiologist and science popularizer, Carl Sagan (1934–1996).

Recipients
Source: American Astronautical Society

1997 Bruce Murray
1998 Wesley Huntress
1999 Ed Stone
2000 Arnauld Nicogossian
2001 Edward Weiler
2002 California and Carnegie Planet Search Team
2003 Roald Sagdeev
2004 Steve Squyres and the Athena Team
2005 Michael Malin
2006 Scott Hubbard
2007 Maria Zuber
2008 Lennard A. Fisk
2009 Award not offered
2010 Award not offered
2011 Charles Elachi
2012 Riccardo Giacconi
2013 Eileen K. Stansbery
2014 William J. Borucki
2015 Frank Cepollina
2016 Alan Stern
2017 AURA "HST &  Beyond" Committee
2018 no award
2019 Michael W. Werner
2020 Leslie Livesay
2021 Nicola Fox

See also
 List of astronomy awards
 List of space technology awards

References

External links
Carl Sagan Memorial Award

Awards of the American Astronautical Society
Astronomy prizes
Carl Sagan